Sara Thornton may refer to:

Dame Sara Thornton (police officer) (born 1962), British police officer
Sara Thornton case, 1989 British legal case concerning a woman who killed her alcoholic husband

See also
Sarah Thornton (born 1965), Canadian-born writer and sociologist of culture